Gimje station is a KTX station in the city of Gimje. It is on the Honam Line.

External links
 Cyber station information from Korail

Railway stations in North Jeolla Province
Gimje
Railway stations opened in 1912
Korea Train Express stations
1912 establishments in Korea